Mark Van Koevering is an American prelate of the Episcopal Church, who is the eighth and current Bishop of Lexington.

Biography
Van Koevering was consecrated as Bishop of Niassa, Mozambique, part of the Anglican Church of Southern Africa, in 2003, where he served until November 2015.

Van Koevering was raised in the Christian Reformed Church. He studied agriculture and plant breeding at university, working in Thailand, China and then as an agriculturist with DanChurchAid in Niassa, Mozambique. There he met and married Helen, who was working with the Christian Council of Mozambique, reuniting war orphans with their families. He was the diocesan director of development when he felt called to the ministry. He trained Trinity College, Bristol and was ordained in Wales, working under Rowan Williams, the then archbishop in Newport when the people of Niassa elected him as their bishop. His wife Helen was ordained shortly before leaving Wales in 2003.

Until April 2011 the Van Koeverings' ministry in Niassa was supported through USPG. In April 2011 The Van Koevering Trust Fund was set up to secure funds for the furthering of the Van Koeverings' ministry in Niassa.

In November 2015, he moved back to the United States, to become the assistant bishop at the Episcopal Diocese of West Virginia.  In February 2018, he became the Bishop Provisional of the Episcopal Diocese of Lexington On November 1, 2019, Bishop Van Koevering was elected the eighth diocesan bishop of the Episcopal Diocese of Lexington.

See also

 List of Episcopal bishops of the United States
 Historical list of the Episcopal bishops of the United States

Notes and references

External links 

 Open Charities - Van Koevering Trust Fund
 Church of Sweden's Report on its assessment visit to Chikweti, Niassa
 Diocese of Niassa

Living people
Year of birth missing (living people)
Place of birth missing (living people)
American Episcopalians
21st-century Anglican bishops in the United States
Anglican bishops of Niassa
Converts to Anglicanism from Calvinism
21st-century Anglican Church of Southern Africa bishops
Episcopal bishops of West Virginia
Episcopal bishops of Lexington
Alumni of Trinity College, Bristol